Beacon Hill-Cyrville Ward is a city ward in Ottawa, Ontario. Located in the city's east end, the ward is bordered to the west by Blair Road from the Ottawa River to Ogilvie Road and St. Laurent Boulevard south of it, the south by the Via Rail train line and Innes Ward, to the east by Green's Creek and Regional Road 174 and to the north by the Ottawa River. It includes the communities of Cyrville, Rothwell Heights, Beacon Hill and Pineview.

Regional and city councillors
Prior to 1994, the area was represented by the Mayor of Gloucester and 2 at large Gloucester city and regional councillors. From 1994 to 2000 the area was covered by Gloucester North and Cyrville Wards on Gloucester City Council.

Michel Bellemare (1994-2010)
Tim Tierney (2010–present)

Election results

2022 Ottawa municipal election

2018 Ottawa municipal election

2014 Ottawa municipal election

2010 Ottawa municipal election

2006 Ottawa municipal election

2003 Ottawa municipal election

2000 Ottawa municipal election
Following Gloucester's amalgamation into Ottawa, incumbent regional councillor Michel Bellemare defeated Gloucester City Councillor (for Cyrville Ward) Pat Clark.

1997 Ottawa-Carleton Regional Municipality elections

1994 Ottawa-Carleton Regional Municipality elections

References

External links
 Map of Beacon Hill-Cyrville

Ottawa wards